Abhayam is a 1970 Indian Malayalam-language film,  directed by Ramu Kariyat and produced by Sobhana Parameswaran Nair. The film is an adaptation of the 1967 novel of the same name by Perumbadavam Sreedharan which was based on the life of Malayalam writer Rajalakshmi. The film stars Sheela, Madhu, Raghavan and Jose Prakash. The film featured original songs composed by V. Dakshinamoorthy and original musical score composed by Salil Chowdhury.

Plot

Cast 

Sheela as Sethulakshmi
Madhu as Balakrishnan
Raghavan as Murali
Jose Prakash as Vikraman
Kottayam Santha as Devaki Amma
Omanakuttan as Editor
Prema as Sathi
Sankaradi as Comrade Sankaran
K. P. Pillai as Rikshawwala
Krishnan Nair as Kunjunni Nair
Devasya as Supplier Kuttappan
Edie as Bhaskara Menon
Kottayam Chellappan as Karunan
Kshema as Student
Mavelikkara Ponnamma as Saraswathi Amma
Philomina as Sr. Briggitte
Radhamani as Student
S. P. Pillai as Pachu Pilla
Sherin Sheela as Mini
Sukumaran as Lecturer
Veeran as Kunjukrishna Menon
Vijayan Nair as Lecturer
Hema  as Student
Unni Menon as Lecturer

Soundtrack 
The songs were composed by V. Dakshinamoorthy and featured lyrics written by Balamaniyamma, Changampuzha, Sreekumaran Thampi, G. Sankara Kurup, Vayalar Ramavarma, Kumaranasan, Vallathol, Sugathakumari and P. Bhaskaran.

The original background score of the movie was composed by Salil Chowdhury.

Box office 
The film became a commercial success.

References

External links 
 

1970 films
1970s Malayalam-language films
Films directed by Ramu Kariat
Films based on Indian novels